The 1915 Colorado Silver and Gold football team was an American football team that represented the University of Colorado as a member of the Rocky Mountain Conference (RMC) during the 1915 college football season. Led by Fred Folsom in his 15 and final season as head coach, Colorado compiled an overall record of 1–6 with a mark of 1–5 in conference play, tying for sixth place in the RMC. It was least successful of his Folsom's 15 seasons as Colorado. Colorado Stadium was renamed Folsom Field in 1944 following his death.

Schedule

References

Colorado
Colorado Buffaloes football seasons
Colorado Silver and Gold football